Mahin (also Romanized as Māhīn; also known as Magan) is a village in Chuqur Rural District, Tarom Sofla District, Qazvin County, Qazvin Province, Iran. At the 2006 census, its population was 233, in 77 families.

References 

Populated places in Qazvin County